Frozen Strait is a waterway in Nunavut just north of Hudson Bay between the Melville Peninsula to the north and Southampton Island to the south. It connects Repulse Bay to the west with Foxe Basin to the east.

In 1615 Robert Bylot was blocked by ice at its east end.  In 1742 Christopher Middleton reached the west end. He sailed north through Roes Welcome Sound to Repulse Bay. Seeing the strait ice-filled in August, it seemed clear that there was no passage so he gave the names Frozen Strait and Repulse Bay. In 1821 William Edward Parry passed the strait with no difficulty. Some have suggested that bowhead whales appear to migrate in the spring and fall through Roes Welcome Sound, but the possibility of migration through Frozen Strait cannot be ruled out.

See also
 Arctic oscillation
 Maunder minimum
 Great Frost of 1683–84
 Great Frost of 1709
 Little Ice Age
 River Thames frost fairs

References

Straits of Kivalliq Region
Foxe Basin